Dariusz Wódke (born 26 February 1957) is a Polish former world champion sabre fencer.

He won the individual sabre championship at the 1981 World Fencing Championships. He won bronze medals in team sabre at the 1979 World Fencing Championships and 1981 World Fencing Championships.

After retiring from competitions, he became a fencing coach in Italy.

References 

Polish male sabre fencers
1957 births
Living people
Fencing_coaches
21st-century Polish people
20th-century Polish people